Brundee is a locality in the City of Shoalhaven in New South Wales, Australia. It lies about 6 km east of Nowra.

References

City of Shoalhaven